Accidental travel is a speculative fiction plot device in which ordinary people accidentally find themselves outside of their normal place or time, often for no apparent reason, a particular type of the “fish-out-of-water” plot. In Russian fandom, the trope is known under the term popadantsy, plural form  for popadanets, female: popadanka, a person who accidentally finds himself elsewhere/elsewhen. The Russian term bears ironical flavor, because popadantsy has become a widespread cliche in Russian pulp science fiction. Russian critic Boris Nevsky traces this plot device to at least Gulliver's Travels (18th century).

Types
The accidental time travel trope is specifically known as time slip. A classical example of time slip is Mark Twain's A Connecticut Yankee in King Arthur's Court (1889), which had considerable influence on later writers.

Other kinds of accidental travel include space travel (e.g., through accidental wormholes, portals (portal fantasy, isekai) or other spatial irregularities, or a catastrophic spatial event), travel to an alternative universe, an RPG universe (litRPG), or into an alternative history. An early example of catastrophic space travel is Hector Servadac (1877) by Jules Verne, where a piece of the Earth with several Earthlings is ripped off by a comet. In Les Robinsons du cosmos (1955) by Francis Carsac, pieces of France and the US with plenty of population are ripped off and planted on an alien planet during a galactic collision. In 1912 Edgar Rice Burroughs invented John Carter of Mars, who lands on Mars from a sacred cave where he was hiding from the Apaches.

Still another way to land somewhere is to be abducted or invited by aliens to live in an advanced star-faring civilization. Common cliches include becoming a slave, or a warrior, or a dying person getting a second chance, with the subsequent social advance.

A particular kind of effortless accidental travel is finding oneself in some other place or time occupying someone's else mind, via body swap (mind swap) or mind/body sharing. Carsac wrote the story with the trick of this type as well: in Terre en fuite (1960) a scientist hit by lightning suddenly becomes a genius and before his death he reveals that his mind melded with the mind of a scientist from far future. However most of the novel is the description of the future of the Earth expecting the Sun to turn supernova.

In Japanese fiction, the genre of accidental transport into a parallel universe or fantasy world is known as isekai.

In Russian fiction

Around the break of the millennium popadanstvo gained an immense popularity in Russian science fiction and fantasy. Responding to the demand, the supply of the novels of this type skyrocketed, with an inevitable drop of the overall quality and degeneration of the inventiveness of the writers into a series of cliches. 

A significant number of popadanstvo occur at a key moment in the Russian past. Armed with modern knowledge, they  turn the tide to the glory of the Motherland, i.e., a popadanets becomes a progressor, creating an alternative history. It was suggested that this phenomenon of Russian science fiction is characterized by two motivations: “Mary Sue”-type drive to self-fulfillment and patriotic nostalgy over the times of Soviet superpower (Communist nostalgia).

A typical Russian popadanets is one of the three types: an everyman, a commando, or a reenactor, with all undergoing a social lift after travel.

While a Russian popadanets used to be a male, since 2000s a flood of pulp fiction emerged featuring female popadanka hero, typically in the form of romance fiction, where popadanka becomes a mighty sorceress or becomes a bride of a mighty man: a king, a sorcerer, an elf, a vampire, etc., often via an “academy of magic”. The livelib.ru website featured 360 books about females landed in a magical world published in 2016, 422 in 2017, and 433 in 2018.

See also

Rip van Winkle, an archetypal story of a man who fell asleep and woke up in a different time many years later.
Robinsonade
Chuanyue
Isekai

References

Science fiction themes
Fantasy tropes